Inoue Chikaya, also known as Shinya Inoue, is a Japanese film editor. He was nominated for an Academy Award in the category Best Film Editing for the film Tora! Tora! Tora!.

Selected filmography 
 Tokyo Drifter (1966)
 Tora! Tora! Tora! (1970; co-nominated with James E. Newcom and Pembroke J. Herring)
 G.I. Samurai (1979)

References

External links 

Possibly living people
Place of birth missing (living people)
Year of birth missing (living people)
Japanese film editors